The 2020 NAIA Football National Championship will be a four-round, sixteen team tournament played between April 11 and May 10, 2021. The tournament will conclude with a single game, played as the 65th Annual NAIA Football National Championship.

The championship game will be played at Eddie Robinson Stadium in Grambling, Louisiana.

References

NAIA Football National Championship

Sports in Grambling, Louisiana
NAIA Football National Championship
2020 in sports in Louisiana
NAIA Football National Championship